The 1964–65 Princeton Tigers men's basketball team represented Princeton University in intercollegiate college basketball during the 1964–65 NCAA University Division men's basketball season. Butch van Breda Kolff served as head coach and the team captain was Bill Bradley.  The team played its home games in the Dillon Gymnasium in Princeton, New Jersey.  The team was the champion of the Ivy League, earning an invitation to the 23-team 1965 NCAA Division I men's basketball tournament.

The team posted a 23–6 overall record and a 13–1 conference record. Then in the East Regional at Cole Field House in College Park, Maryland, the team defeated  66–48 on March 12 and  109–69 on March 13. Then on March 19 in the national semifinal at the Memorial Coliseum Portland, Oregon, the team was defeated by the Cazzie Russell-led Michigan Wolverines 93–76 before beating the Wichita State Shockers 118–82 the following night. Bill Bradley earned the NCAA basketball tournament Most Outstanding Player award.

Bradley, who for third consecutive season led the conference in scoring with a 28.8 points per game average in conference games, was a first team All-Ivy League selection.  In addition, Bradley was a repeat consensus first team 1965 NCAA Men's Basketball All-American selection by numerous panels: First team (Associated Press, United Press International, National Association of Basketball Coaches, United States Basketball Writers Association, Sporting News, Converse, NEA, Helms Foundation).  Bradley also won a Rhodes Scholarship and was a territorial first round selection in the 1965 NBA Draft by the New York Knicks.  Bradley surpassed Arthur Loeb (1921–22 and 1922–23) and Cyril Haas (1915–16 and 1916–17) as the school's only three-time men's basketball All-American selection. Over the course of the season, Bradley won the national statistical championship for free throw percentage (88.6%, 273–308).

As a result of his performance against Wichita State in the final four, Bradley holds the following NCAA Division I men's basketball tournament records: single-game points scored in a final four (58), single-game field goals made in a final four (22), single-year two-game points scored in a final four (87), and single-year two-game field goals made in a final four (34).  Additionally, Bradley formerly held the final four single-game free throw percentage record of 93.3% (minimum 10 made, 14–15), which was broken on March 23, 1972, and single-year two-game free throw percentage record 95.0% (minimum 12 made, 19–20), which was broken in 1972.

The team's performance against Wichita State established the current final four victory margin record (36) and the final four single-team single-half points scored record (65, tied).  The team's performance formerly held two other final four records: single-half two-team points scored (108, broken March 25, 1972) and single-year two-game field goals made (78, broken in 1977).

Bradley continues to hold the single-game, single-season, and career total and average points Ivy League records. In addition, he holds the Ivy records for single-game, single-season, and career field goals made as well as single-season, and career free throws made.  His career points, career average, career field goals achieved in 1965 surpassed Tony Lavelli (1949), Chet Forte (1957) and Ernie Beck (1953), respectively. His single-game points record surpassed Lavelli's 52 set on February 26, 1949.  His 1965 career 87.6% free throw percentage, which surpassed Gus Broberg's 1941 mark of 85.8%, stood as the Ivy League record until it was eclipsed by Joe Hieser in 1968.

Regular season
The team posted a 23–6 (13–1 Ivy League) record.

! = ECAC Holiday Classic at New York
@ = NCAA first round at Philadelphia
 # = NCAA East Regional at College Park, Md.
$ = NCAA Final Four at Portland, Ore.

Home games in CAPS

NCAA tournament
The team advanced to the 1965 NCAA Division I men's basketball tournament Final four.

3/8/65 in Philadelphia, Pa.: Princeton 60, Penn State 58

East Regional
3/12/65 in College Park, Md.: Princeton 66, N.C. State 48
3/13/65 in College Park, Md.: Princeton 109, Providence 69

Final Four
3/19/65 in Portland, Ore.: Michigan 93, Princeton 76
3/20/65 in Portland, Ore.: Princeton 118, Wichita State 82

Awards and honors
 Bill Bradley
 NCAA basketball tournament Most Outstanding Player
 Ivy League Scoring Champion
 First Team All-Ivy League
 1965 NCAA Men's Basketball All-American (consensus)
 All-East
 Gary Walters
 Honorable Mention All-Ivy League
 Ed Hummer
 Honorable Mention All-Ivy League

Team players drafted into the NBA
Two players from this team were selected in the NBA Draft.

Future Major League Baseball (MLB) executive Larry Lucchino was a reserve on the team.

References

Princeton Tigers men's basketball seasons
Princeton Tigers
NCAA Division I men's basketball tournament Final Four seasons
Princeton
Princeton Tigers men's basketball
Princeton Tigers men's basketball